The Solicitor General of the Gambia is a senior government lawyer in the Gambia who serves as the second most senior official in the Ministry of Justice after the Attorney General/Minister of Justice. The incumbent Solicitor General is Cherno Marenah.

Role 
The Solicitor General is the deputy to the Attorney General, and has the authority to act on their behalf in their absence. The statutory basis for this authority in the Gambia is found in the Law Officers Act. In the Gambia, the Solicitor General also serves as the Legal Secretary, effectively the permanent secretary at the Ministry of Justice.

In his book, Journey for Justice, Hassan Bubacar Jallow noted that the office of Solicitor General is a "peculiarity of the English legal system and is of long vintage." He quotes from Chief Justice John Eardley Wilmot in 1770 who said that "the Solicitor General is the Secondarius attornatus; and as the Courts take notice judicially of the Attorney General when there is one, they take notice of the Solicitor General, as standing in his place, when there is none. He is a known and sworn officer of the crown, as much as the attorney; and, in the vacancy of that office, does every act, and executes every branch of it."

List of Solicitors General 

 Cherno Marenah, 2017–present
 Saffie Sankareh, 2016–2017
 Cherno Marenah, November 2014–May 2016
 Pa Harry Jammeh, 2010–2013
 Raymond Sock, 2000–2005
Janet Ramatoulie Sallah-Njie, 1998–2000
Fatou Bensouda, 1997–1998
 Amie N. D. Bensouda, 1990–1995
 Hassan Bubacar Jallow, 1982–1984

References 

Government of the Gambia
Gambia